The Protefs class (referred to as the Proteus class in some sources) was a group of submarines built for the Hellenic Navy in the late 1920s. The boats were built to a Loire-Simonot design in France and were larger than the preceding Katsonis class built by a different French company.

Four boats were built, all were named after sea gods from Greek mythology.

The three boats which survived the fall of Greece in 1941 served under overall Royal Navy control in the Eastern Mediterranean.

References

Bibliography

 
 

Submarines of the Hellenic Navy
French submarines in foreign service
France–Greece relations
World War II submarines of Greece